Cainsville is an unincorporated community in Wilson County, in the U.S. state of Tennessee.

History
Cainsville was platted in 1829, and named for George I. Cain, the original owner of the town site. A post office called Cainsville was established in 1830, and remained in operation until 1903.

References

Unincorporated communities in Wilson County, Tennessee
Unincorporated communities in Tennessee